James Robert Campbell (born June 24, 1937 in Palo Alto, California) is an American former professional baseball player, a catcher who played 82 games in the Major Leagues for the Houston Colt .45s during  and .

Campbell was acquired by the Colt .45s over a full season before the team played an official big-league game.  He'd signed originally with the Pittsburgh Pirates in 1955, was briefly loaned to the Chicago White Sox organization, and played for six seasons without reaching the Double-A level.  After the 1960 minor-league season, he was drafted by the Milwaukee Braves, then traded on February 23, 1961, to the newborn Colt .45s,  founded as a National League expansion team set to debut in 1962. To prepare for their first MLB season, the Colt .45s — known as the Astros since 1965 — were acquiring minor league players to stock their organization and loaning them to other teams' minor-league clubs.  Campbell was assigned to the 1961 Houston Buffs, the Triple-A affiliate of the Chicago Cubs and the last minor-league team to represent Houston.  Campbell was the Buffs' first-string catcher in 1961 and then was assigned to the Colt .45s' top 1962 affiliate, the Oklahoma City 89ers of the American Association.

Campbell batted .350 in 70 games played for the 89ers and earned a promotion to the big-league Colt .45s in July. He appeared in 27 games over the remainder of 1962, 25 as a starting catcher, and batted .221 with three home runs and six runs batted in. He then began the 1963 season on the Houston roster, caught the opening day game against the defending league champion San Francisco Giants, and  started the next four games in succession. But he collected only one  hit and was batting only .056 when he was replaced in the lineup by veteran Hal Smith.  Campbell batted only .118 in April and it would be June 5 before his average climbed above the .200 level.  On July 23, he made his final MLB appearance as a pinch hitter, singling in the seventh inning off Dallas Green of the Philadelphia Phillies in a game Houston would eventually win in 15 innings.  It was his 54th Major League hit; in addition to his seven career home runs, he had seven doubles.

Campbell finished 1963 with Oklahoma City and continued his minor league career at Triple-A through 1965.

References

External links

1937 births
Living people
Baseball players from California
Billings Mustangs players
Douglas Copper Kings players
Houston Buffs players
Houston Colt .45s players
Idaho Falls Russets players
Las Vegas Wranglers (baseball) players
Lincoln Chiefs players
Major League Baseball catchers
Oklahoma City 89ers players
Sportspeople from Palo Alto, California
Salinas Packers players
San Diego Padres (minor league) players
San Jose Pirates players
Savannah Pirates players
Seattle Angels players